The 2016 FIVB Volleyball Men's Club World Championship was the 12th edition of the event. It was held in Betim, Brazil from 18 to 23 October 2016.

Brazil's Sada Cruzeiro defeated Russia's Zenit Kazan in the final and won FIVB Men’s Club World Championship for the second time in a row and third on their history. Italy's Trentino Diatec claimed the bronze medal by defeating Argentina's Personal Bolívar in the third place match. William Arjona from Sada Cruzeiro was elected the Most Valuable Player.

Qualification

Pools composition

Squads

Venue

Pool standing procedure
 Number of matches won
 Match points
 Sets ratio
 Points ratio
 Result of the last match between the tied teams

Match won 3–0 or 3–1: 3 match points for the winner, 0 match points for the loser
Match won 3–2: 2 match points for the winner, 1 match point for the loser

Preliminary round
All times are Brasília Summer Time (UTC−02:00).

Pool A

|}

|}

Pool B

|}

|}

Final round
All times are Brasília Summer Time (UTC−02:00).

Semifinals

|}

3rd place match

|}

Final

|}

Final standing

Awards

Most Valuable Player
 William Arjona (Sada Cruzeiro)
Best Setter
 Simone Giannelli (Trentino Diatec)
Best Outside Spikers
 Yoandy Leal (Sada Cruzeiro)
 Wilfredo León (Zenit Kazan)

Best Middle Blockers
 Pablo Crer (Personal Bolívar)
 Artem Volvich (Zenit Kazan)
Best Opposite Spiker
 Evandro Guerra (Sada Cruzeiro)
Best Libero
 Sérgio Nogueira (Sada Cruzeiro)

See also
2016 FIVB Volleyball Women's Club World Championship

References

External links
Official website
Final Standing
Awards
Formula
Statistics

FIVB Volleyball Men's Club World Championship
FIVB Men's Club World Championship
FIVB Men's Club World Championship
2016 FIVB Men's Club World Championship
Sport in Minas Gerais
FIVB Volleyball Men's Club World Championship